

List

References

S